Eight ships of the Royal Navy have borne the name HMS Augusta or HMS Auguste, whilst another two were planned:

 was a 60-gun fourth rate captured from the French in 1705.  She was wrecked in 1716 when she ran ashore on the island of Anholt (Denmark) in heavy weather.
 was a 60-gun fourth rate launched in 1736 and broken up by 1765.
 was a 64-gun third rate launched in 1763 and burnt in 1777.
 was a yacht launched in 1771.  She was renamed HMS Princess Augusta in 1773 and was sold in 1818.
 was a gunboat and ex-barge purchased in 1795 and in service until at least 1801.
HMS Augusta was to have been a 74-gun third rate.  She was laid down in 1806 but was cancelled in 1809.
 was a schooner, formerly in civilian service under the name Policy.  She was purchased in 1819 and sold in 1823.
 was a two-gun schooner launched in 1853 and in service until at least 1866.

See also
She was renamed HMY Augusta in 1761 and was broken up in 1771.

Royal Navy ship names